Luc Colin (1 June 1935 – 25 May 1999) was a French cross-country skier. He competed in the men's 30 kilometre event at the 1968 Winter Olympics.

References

External links
 

1935 births
1999 deaths
French male cross-country skiers
Olympic cross-country skiers of France
Cross-country skiers at the 1968 Winter Olympics
Sportspeople from Vosges (department)
20th-century French people